WFTX-TV (channel 36) is a television station licensed to Cape Coral, Florida, United States, serving as the Fox affiliate for Southwest Florida. Owned by the E.W. Scripps Company, the station has studios on Southwest Pine Island Road (SR 78) in Cape Coral, and its transmitter is located near Punta Gorda (east of I-75/SR 93) near the Charlotte and Lee county line.

WFTX-TV is branded as Fox 4, in reference to its channel location on most cable systems in the market, which it has enjoyed since its sign on in 1985.

History
In 1982, interest began in the channel 36 allocation to Cape Coral. In 1984, out of four applications, a Federal Communications Commission (FCC) administrative law judge gave the nod to Florida Family Broadcasting Limited, which included one Native American and one Asian investor, over three other groups seeking the construction permit. Florida Family—a company associated with Family Group Broadcasting, which two years prior had signed on WFTS-TV in Tampa—had to settle with the other applicants, a process that look longer than expected.

Construction work began in April, and after a prolonged construction marked by delays due to high winds, WFTX-TV started broadcasting on October 14, 1985. It was the first independent station in Southwest Florida, and from the start, it aired on channel 4 on most systems. Within a year of building WFTX-TV, Family Group sold it for $17 million to Terre Haute, Indiana-based Wabash Valley Broadcasting, controlled by the family of Tony Hulman; Wabash Valley, which owned WTHI-TV in its home town of Terre Haute, had also agreed to purchase WBSP-TV in Ocala earlier that year.

Even though it was on the air in 1985, a full studio facility was not completed until 1987; that same year, the station affiliated with Fox (partly to prevent new independent WNPL-TV channel 46 from doing so) and extended its coverage north with an increase in tower height. WFTX even pitched ABC on defecting from its affiliate, perennial third-place station WEVU-TV, in 1988. With Fox, channel 36's programming rapidly grew in ratings. Its first major local program, the consumer series Troubleshooter, was outdrawing national and local newscasts by 1991.

The station changed hands again in 1998, when Emmis Communications purchased the assets of Wabash Valley Broadcasting, giving Emmis its first television stations. From 2002 to 2005, WFTX's master control and other internal operations were controlled from a regional hub located at the company's WKCF in Lake Mary, near Orlando. Emmis exited the television business in 2005, with Journal Broadcast Group acquiring WFTX and two other stations.

On July 30, 2014, it was announced that the E. W. Scripps Company would acquire Journal Communications in an all-stock transaction and spin off the combined company's print assets. The deal made WFTX a sister station once again to WFTS and also NBC affiliate WPTV-TV in West Palm Beach. The FCC approved the deal on December 12, 2014. It was approved by shareholders on March 11, 2015, closing on April 1.

In the fall of 2021, WFTX added Ion Television as a subchannel after Scripps' acquisition of Ion Media, bringing the network over-the-air to Southwest Florida for the first time since its 1998 launch. The Fort Myers–Naples market was the only market in the state outside Tallahassee which never had a station owned by Ion Media or its forerunner companies.

News operation
In 1992, WFTX announced it would start a local news service in 1993. The first 10 p.m. newscast aired on October 10, 1993, In its first year, the Associated Press selected WFTX as having the best medium-market newscast in the state of Florida. A 6 p.m. program was added in 1995, incorporating the previously separate Troubleshooter show; low ratings prompted its cancellation in 2000.

After the sale to Journal, WFTX expanded its news department with a focus on consumer advocacy and investigative reporting. A weekday morning newscast titled Fox 4 News Rising subsequently debuted in the fall of 2006; the station launched an 11 p.m. newscast in 2007 and a 6 p.m. show in 2010. A 5 p.m. hour has since been added.

Due to the highly competitive nature of the Fort Myers–Naples market, WFTX's flagship 10 p.m. newscast has attracted competition over the years. In August 2006 when ABC affiliate WZVN-TV (channel 26) announced that it would launch a nightly prime time newscast on cable-only MyNetworkTV affiliate "WNFM". On March 26, 2007, CBS affiliate WINK-TV (channel 11) entering into the 10 p.m. race with its own broadcast on CW affiliate WXCW. Right from the start, this emerged as a strong second-place finisher to WFTX's longer-established newscast, building on WINK-TV's longtime status as the most watched station in the market. On May 25 after only eight months on-the-air, the nightly WZVN-produced newscasts on WNFM were dropped, due to Comcast's frequent technical difficulties (the cable provider operates the MyNetworkTV affiliate) which hindered in the program's ratings, as well as the success of the WXCW production. To take on the big three stations, WFTX began airing an hour-long weeknight 6 p.m. newscast on August 2, 2010, with the second half competing against the national evening news programs on WZVN, WBBH and WINK.

Notable former on-air staff 
Michelle Tuzee — anchor/reporter (later with KABC-TV in Los Angeles)

Technical information

Subchannels
The station's digital signal is multiplexed:

Analog-to-digital conversion
WFTX-TV discontinued regular programming on its analog signal, over UHF channel 36, on June 12, 2009, the official date in which full-power television stations in the United States transitioned from analog to digital broadcasts under federal mandate. The station's digital signal continued to broadcast on its pre-transition UHF channel 35.

See also
Channel 4 branded TV stations in the United States
Channel 34 digital TV stations in the United States
Channel 36 virtual TV stations in the United States

References

External links

FTX-TV
Fox network affiliates
Ion Television affiliates
Bounce TV affiliates
Grit (TV network) affiliates
Court TV affiliates
Television channels and stations established in 1985
Cape Coral, Florida
E. W. Scripps Company television stations
1985 establishments in Florida